is a 1970 Japanese film directed by Toshiya Fujita.

Plot
Two years ago, Yuji Nishigami was in prison for an injury, and now finally released on parole. A stranger(Nao Matsukata) is waiting for his return from prison. Nao recently failed in a deal, and was robbed Marijuana and his partner Shuhei. Nao asks Yuji to solve the incident together.

Cast

 Tetsuya Watari as Yuji Nishigami
 Yoshio Harada as Nao Matsukata
 Meiko Kaji as Shoko
 Mikio Narita as Sasori
 Kenji Imai as Yuasa
 Masaya Oki as Rikiya

References

External links 

1970 films
Nikkatsu films
Films directed by Toshiya Fujita
1970s Japanese films